QML is a user interface markup language, used with Qt Quick.

QML or qml may also refer to:

Computing
 Questions Markup Language, a markup language, the predecessor of QTI (IMS Question and Test Interoperability specification)
 QML, a Haskell like functional quantum programming language
 Quantum machine learning, the integration of quantum algorithms within machine learning programs
 .qml, file extension for stylesheets for the QGIS geographic information system

Other uses
 Queen Mary University of London
 Queensland Medical Laboratory
 Quake Movie Library, a collection of Machinima
 Quantified modal logic, a modal logic originally developed by Ruth Barcan Marcus
 Qualified Manufacturer List, term used by the United States Department of Defense
 ISO 639:qml, an ISO 639-3 language code